Wander Bra is a 2018 Filipino comedy film written and directed by Joven Tan, starring Kakai Bautista, Myrtle Sarrosa, Gardo Versoza and Gina Pareño. The film was produced by Viva Films and it was released in the Philippines on September 12, 2018.

Cast

References

External links

Viva Films films
Philippine comedy films
Films directed by Joven Tan